Mo' Voodoo is an EP by American rock band Gov't Mule, released in May 2005. It consists of additional material recorded during breaks of the band's last tour. It is now included as a bonus CD of the Deja Voodoo album.

Track listing
"King's Highway" (Joe Henry) – 4:54
"I'll Be the One" (Haynes) – 6:00
"My Oh My" (David Gray/Craig McClune) – 5:07
"I Can't Be You" (Haynes) – 4:33
"Ballerina" (Van Morrison) – 6:32

Total runtime: 27:11

Personnel
Warren Haynes – vocals, guitar
Matt Abts – drums
Danny Louis – keyboards
Andy Hess – bass
Michael Barbiero – production

References

Gov't Mule albums
2005 EPs